Thomas Cameron Jacobs (March 10, 1962 – February 18, 2023) was a former American football linebacker who played in the National Football League for the Tampa Bay Buccaneers. Known most notably as a replacement player during the 1987 NFL strike, Jacobs was originally drafted by the Pittsburgh Steelers in the 1985 NFL Draft. He played college football at Kentucky.

References 

1962 births
2023 deaths
American football linebackers
Coral Gables Senior High School alumni
Kentucky Wildcats football players
National Football League replacement players
People from Oklahoma City
Pittsburgh Steelers players
Players of American football from Oklahoma
Tampa Bay Buccaneers players